Waroch may refer to:
Waroch I (d. c. 550), Breton ruler of the Vannetais
Waroch II (fl. 578–90), grandson, Breton ruler of the Vannetais